Mallocephala rubripes is a moth in subfamily Arctiinae first described by Blanchard in 1852. It is found in Chile.

Subspecies
Mallocephala rubripes rubripes
Mallocephala rubripes bifurcata (Ruiz, 1989)
Mallocephala rubripes brevisaccus (Ruiz, 1989)
Mallocephala rubripes clerica (Ruiz, 1989)

References

Arctiini
Monotypic moth genera
Moths of South America
Endemic fauna of Chile